Kohistan, also transliterated Kuhistan, Kuhiston, Quhistan, may refer to:

In Afghanistan 
Kohistan District, Kapisa, Kapisa Province
 Kohistan Hesa Awal District, a district in Kapisa Province, created within the former Kohistan District
 Kohistan Hesa Duwum District, a district in Kapisa Province, created within the former Kohistan District
 Kohistan District, Badakhshan, a district in Badakhshan Province
 Kohistan District, Faryab, a district in Faryab Province

In Pakistan 
 Kohistan District, Pakistan, in Khyber Pakhtunkhwa province
 Upper Kohistan District
 Lower Kohistan District
 Kolai Pallas Kohistan
 Kohistan, Upper Dir, a town in Upper Dir

In Tajikistan 
 Kohistan-Badakshan, the Tajik name of Gorno-Badakshan

In Iran 
 Quhistan, a region of medieval Persia, the southern part of Greater Khorasan

See also 
 Kohistan District (disambiguation)
 Kohistani (disambiguation)